The 2015 NHL Stadium Series was an outdoor regular season National Hockey League (NHL) game, part of the Stadium Series of games held at football or baseball stadiums. The Los Angeles Kings played against the San Jose Sharks at Levi's Stadium in Santa Clara, California on February 21, 2015. This was the only game in the Stadium Series during the 2014–15 NHL regular season (as opposed to multiple games in 2014 and 2016). The game coincided with NBC Sports' "Hockey Day in America" coverage, and aired on NBCSN in the United States, while it was the second game of CBC's Hockey Night in Canada doubleheader.

The Kings defeated the Sharks 2–1 on a goal by Marián Gáborík early in the third period to extend the Kings' winning streak to seven games, while the Sharks fell to 2–5–1 in their last eight games. With the victory, the Kings overtook the Sharks for the final wild card spot in the Western Conference.

Initial announcement
After the success of the 2014 NHL Stadium Series game at Dodger Stadium, it was widely rumored that there was going to be an outdoor game in Northern California with Levi's Stadium, AT&T Park and Stanford Stadium as the three most likely options to host the outdoor game. On August 6, 2014, it was officially announced that Levi's Stadium was going to host the game between the Sharks and the Kings. The NHL was originally reportedly looking to hold four outdoor games, including the Winter Classic. Besides Levi's Stadium, other possible sites for the Stadium Series games included Coors Field (Denver), Gillette Stadium (Foxborough, Massachusetts), Target Field (Minneapolis), Beaver Stadium (Pennsylvania State University), and an as-yet-unnamed venue in the Phoenix area. Foxborough, Minneapolis and Denver will instead host 2016 outdoor contests.

Game summary

Kings goalie Jonathan Quick stopped 31 of 32 shots in the win. Kyle Clifford got Los Angeles on the board first at 2:46 in the first period. Brent Burns then scored the equalizer for the Sharks at 18:56 late in the first period. After a scoreless second period, Marian Gaborik scored at 4:04 in the third period in what proved to be the game-winning goal for the Kings.

Number in parenthesis represents the player's total in goals or assists to that point of the season

Team rosters

 Martin Jones and Alex Stalock dressed as the back up goaltenders. Neither entered the game.

Scratches
Los Angeles Kings: Andy Andreoff, Alec Martinez, Derek Forbort
San Jose Sharks: Mirco Müller, Chris Tierney, Barclay Goodrow

Officials
 Referees — Dan O'Halloran, Gord Dwyer
 Linesmen — Steve Barton, David Brisebois

Pregame/Anthem/Entertainment
Before puck-drop Kris Allen and the Symphony Silicon Valley performed and sang the anthem

Melissa Etheridge performed during the second intermission

See also

 NHL Winter Classic
 NHL Heritage Classic
 List of outdoor ice hockey games
 2014 NHL Stadium Series
 Kings–Sharks rivalry

References 

2015 Stadium Series
NHL Stadium Series
NHL
Sports competitions in Santa Clara, California
Los Angeles Kings games
San Jose Sharks games
February 2015 sports events in the United States
Ice hockey competitions in California